The Techirghiol stickleback (Gasterosteus crenobiontus) was an endemic fish species, found in the streams inflowing to the coastal hypersaline Lake Techirghiol in southern Romania. It was a freshwater benthopelagic fish, up to  SL in length.  It is considered extinct due to hybridization with the three-spined stickleback following irrigation which allowed the two taxa to mix by diluting the hypersaline water barrier which separated them. The last known occurrence of the species was in the 1960s.

References

External links
 Gasterosteus crenobiontus at FishBase

Techirghiol stickleback
Endemic fauna of Romania
Extinct animals of Europe
Fish extinctions since 1500
Techirghiol stickleback